Karl Lark-Horovitz (July 20, 1892 – April 14, 1958) was an American physicist known for his pioneering work in solid-state physics that played a role in the invention of the transistor. He brought the previously neglected Physics Department at Purdue University to prominence during his tenure there as department head from 1929 until his death in 1958.

Early years 
Born Karl Horovitz in Vienna, Austria, on July 20, 1892, he was encouraged by both his father, Moritz, (dermatologist) and mother, Adele (Hofmann), to pursue varied scholarly interests.  Horovitz choose to attend Humanistic School for secondary education.

Academic Research

References

External links
 A biography of Karl Lark-Horovitz
 Biography at Purdue website

20th-century American physicists
1892 births
1958 deaths
Fellows of the American Physical Society